Glen De Boeck (born 22 August 1971) is a Belgian football manager and former player who most recently managed Lokeren in the Belgian First Division B. During his career he played as central defender, mostly on the books of Anderlecht.

Club career
De Boeck was born in Boom. In the summer of 1995, he moved from KV Mechelen to Anderlecht. In the late 1990s, he was criticized by pundits, who claimed he was not good enough for Anderlecht. He eventually increased his technical performances to become one of the best defenders in The Jupiler Pro League in the early 2000s.

In February 2005, De Boeck decided to end his career due to a heavy knee injury.

International career
De Boeck made his international debut with Belgium on 6 October 1993, against Gabon (a friendly), going on to represent his country at two World Cups, with three appearances combined.

Coaching career
De Boeck was directly snapped up by his last club Anderlecht to become an assistant manager, together with Daniel Renders.

On 23 April 2007, it was revealed that De Boeck would become manager of first division side Cercle Brugge at the end of the 2006–07 season. He succeeded Harm Van Veldhoven, who had already chosen to leave for Germinal Beerschot. On 1 February 2008, the board of directors at Cercle declared De Boeck had signed a new contract until 2011, as he also became the football section's technical director, being made responsible for the further development of the football team. In March 2009, De Boeck denied K.R.C. Genk in signing him as their new coach. Instead he choose to stay with his current club Cercle Brugge. He left Cercle in June 2010 and was named the manager of Germinal Beerschot who were looking for a successor to Jos Daerden who left to become an assistant coach at Dutch club Twente.

On 30 November 2010, after continuous bad results and disagreements on the management board, he was fired as coach from Germinal Beerschot.

At the start of the 2011–12 season De Boeck was appointed as the new manager of VVV-Venlo, but halfway through the season on 6 December 2011, following a 7–0 defeat to Heracles Almelo, he resigned as manager of VVV-Venlo. In November 2012 he signed for Waasland-Beveren, but was released one year later.

Honours

Player 
Anderlecht
 Belgian First Division: 1999–00, 2000–01, 2003–04
 Belgian Cup: runners-up 1996–97
Belgian Super Cup: 2000, 2001
 Belgian League Cup: 2000
 Belgian Sports Team of the Year: 2000
 Jules Pappaert Cup: 2000, 2001

Belgium
 FIFA Fair Play Trophy: 2002 World Cup

Manager 
Cercle Brugge
 Belgian Cup: runners-up 2009–10

References

External links
 Cercle Brugge profile 
 

Living people
1971 births
Belgian footballers
Association football central defenders
Belgium international footballers
1998 FIFA World Cup players
2002 FIFA World Cup players
Belgian Pro League players
R.S.C. Anderlecht players
K.V. Mechelen players
Belgian football managers
Cercle Brugge K.S.V. managers
Beerschot A.C. managers
VVV-Venlo managers
K.V. Kortrijk managers
K.S.C. Lokeren Oost-Vlaanderen managers
People from Boom, Belgium
Footballers from Antwerp Province
Belgian expatriate football managers
Belgian expatriate sportspeople in the Netherlands
Expatriate football managers in the Netherlands